André Carrère (Villeneuve-de-Marsan, 6 March 1924 - Biganos, 21 February 2015) was a French rugby union and league footballer. After making his rugby union debut for Stade Montois, he switched codes to rugby league in 1951, playing for Villeneuve-sur-Lot and was capped twice for France in 1953.

Biography
Born in Villeneuve-de-Marsan, where he discovered rugby union, Carrère joined the Stade Montois club, which was close to his hometown. In 1951, he switched to rugby league at Villeneuve-sur-Lot, scouted by the doctor Pierre Mourgues. In 1953, he was capped two times for the France national team.

Honours

Rugby union
Runner up at the French Rugby Union Championship:  1949 (Stade Montois)

Rugby league
Runner up at the Lord Derby Cup: 1953 (Villeneuve XIII RLLG)
Runner up at the Rugby League World Cup: 1954 ( France)

Personal life
Outside of the pitch, he was a fusilier marin during his military service for the French Navy.
His brother, Robert Carrère, still played rugby union, disputed the final of the French Rugby Union Championship in 1953 playing for Stade Montois.

References

External links
André Carrère profile at rugbyleagueproject.com

1924 births
2015 deaths
Sportspeople from Landes (department)
Stade Montois players
Villeneuve Leopards players
French rugby league players
Rugby league props
French rugby union players
France national rugby league team players